The National Assembly (or ), is the general representative body of Slovenia. According to the Constitution of Slovenia and the Constitutional Court of Slovenia, it is the major part of the distinctively incompletely bicameral Slovenian Parliament, the legislative branch of the Republic of Slovenia. It has 90 members, elected for a four-year term. 88 members are elected using the party-list proportional representation system and the remaining two, using the Borda count, by the Hungarian and Italian-speaking ethnic minorities, who have an absolute veto in matters concerning their ethnic groups.

As of May 2022, the 9th National Assembly of the Republic of Slovenia is in session.

Legislative procedure 
A bill can be submitted to the National Assembly by:

 the Government
 an MP
 the National Council
 5,000 voters

The legislative procedure begins when the Speaker passes a bill to the MPs.

There are three possible legislative procedures:

 regular legislative procedure
 abbreviated legislative procedure
 urgent legislative procedure

Bills are normally passed by a majority of the present MPs. If the Constitution demands a two-thirds majority (laws regulating electoral systems, referendums and constitutional laws which amend the Constitution), then at least 60 of the 90 MPs must vote for the bill for passage.

Regular legislative procedure

First reading 
The first reading is completed with passing the bill to the MPs by the Speaker, unless ten MPs request a session of the assembly within 15 days to discuss reasons why bill was submitted.

If the session is held, the assembly must vote on the resolution if the bill is appropriate for a further procedure.

The Speaker determines a working body that will discuss the bill in the further procedure. Other bodies can also discuss the bill if there is such interest, however they cannot vote on it.

Second reading 
During the second reading bill is first discussed by the working body that can amend the bill and make a report on the bill which is the basis for the plenary of assembly. Working body discusses and votes on each article of the bill. Assembly later votes and discusses only the articles that were amended during the session of the working body.

Assembly and working body can accept a resolution that the bill is not appropriate for a furder procedure if not such resolution was accepted during the first reading.

Third reading 
In the third reading working body and assembly vote on the bill as a whole. If it is accepted the bill is sent to the President to sign it.

Shortened legislative procedure 
During shortened legislative procedure there is no first reading and the second and third readings are held at the same session.

It can be applied for a bills that regulate minor matters, another law is abolished with the bill, if national laws have to be harmonised with Acquis communautaire or when bill regulates procedures before the Constitutional Court or Constitutional Court order changes of the laws.

Urgent legislative procedure 
Bill can be passed under urgent procedure if it is important for the security or defence of the country, if it is addressing the consequences of natural disasters or it is proposed to prevent irreversible consequences for the country.

There is no first reading, the second and third readings are held at the same session, amendments to the bill can be given orally and timeline of the procedure is shorter.

Demand for new vote on the law 
When the bill is passed, the National Council can demand that National Assembly vote again on the bill. A greater majority is needed to pass the bill in the new vote.

List of speakers of the National Assembly 

1. France Bučar (SDZ): 9 May 1990 – 23 December 1992
2. Herman Rigelnik (LDS): 23 December 1992 – 14 September 1994
-- Miroslav Mozetič (acting) (SKD): 14 September 1994 - 16 September 1994
3. Jožef Školč (LDS): 16 September 1994 – 3 December 1996
4. Janez Podobnik (SLS): 3 December 1996 – 27 October 2000
5. Borut Pahor (ZLSD): 10 November 2000 – 9 July 2004
-- Valentin Pohorec (acting) (DeSUS): 9–12 July 2004
6. Feri Horvat (ZLSD): 12 July 2004 – 22 October 2004
7. France Cukjati (SDS): 22 October 2004 – 15 October 2008
8. Pavel Gantar (Zares): 15 October 2008 – 2 September 2011
-- Vasja Klavora (acting) (Desus): 2 September 2011
9. Ljubo Germič (LDS): 2 September 2011 – 21 December 2011
10. Gregor Virant (LGV/DL): 21 December 2011 – 28 January 2013
-- Jakob Presečnik (acting) (SLS): 28 January 2013 – 27 February 2013
11. Janko Veber (SD): 27 February 2013 – 1 August 2014
12. Milan Brglez (SMC): 1 August 2014 – 22 June 2018
13. Matej Tonin (NSi): 22 June 2018 – 23 August 2018
-- Tina Heferle (acting) (LMŠ): 23 August 2018
14. Dejan Židan (SD): 23 August 2018 – 3 March 2020
-- Branko Simonovič (acting) (Desus): 3 March 2020 - 5 March 2020
15. Igor Zorčič (SMC): 5 March 2020 - 13 May 2022
16. Urška Klakočar Zupančič (GS): 13 May 2022 - (incumbent)

Electoral system 
The 90 members of the National Assembly are elected by two methods. 88 are elected by open list proportional representation in eight 11-seat constituencies and seats are allocated to the parties at the constituency level using the Droop quota. The elected Deputies are identified by ranking all of a party's candidates in a constituency by the percentage of votes they received in their district. The seats that remain unallocated are allocated to the parties at the national level using the d'Hondt method with an electoral threshold of 4%. Although the country is divided into 88 electoral districts, deputies are not elected from all 88 districts. More than one deputy is elected in some districts, which results in some districts not having an elected deputy (for instance, 21 of 88 electoral districts did not have an elected deputy in the 2014 elections). Parties must have at least 35% of their lists from each gender, except in cases where there are only three candidates. For these lists, there must be at least one candidate of each gender.

Two additional deputies are elected by the Italian and Hungarian minorities. Voters rank all of the candidates on the ballot paper using numbers (1 being highest priority). A candidate is awarded the most points (equal to the number of candidates on the ballot paper) when a voter ranks them first. The candidate with most points wins.

Latest election

Elections of the representatives of national minorities

Italian national minority

Hungarian national minority

Terms

 1st National Assembly
 2nd National Assembly
 3rd National Assembly
 4th National Assembly
 5th National Assembly
 6th National Assembly
 7th National Assembly
 8th National Assembly

Members

List of members of the 8th National Assembly of the Republic of Slovenia

Notes

References

Further reading 
 Toplak, Jurij. The parliamentary election in Slovenia, October 2004. Electoral Studies 25 (2006) 825-831.

External links 
 

 
Slovenian Parliament
Organizations based in Ljubljana
1992 establishments in Slovenia
Slovenia